Scary Mother is a 2017 Georgian drama film directed by Ana Urushadze. At the 23rd Sarajevo Film Festival, the film won the top prize, the Heart of Sarajevo. It was selected as the Georgian entry for the Best Foreign Language Film at the 90th Academy Awards, but it was not nominated. Actress, Nato Murvanidze won the award for Best Performance by an Actress at the 2017 Asia Pacific Screen Awards for her performance in the film.

Plot
Manana, a middle-aged woman, hopes to find herself by secretly penning a darkly erotic thriller. She hides the writing from her husband Anri, but tensions heighten after she lets him read an excerpt.

Cast
 Nato Murvanidze as Manana
 Dimitri Tatishvili as Anri
 Ramaz Ioseliani as Nukri
 Avtandil Makharadze as Jarji

See also
 List of submissions to the 90th Academy Awards for Best Foreign Language Film
 List of Georgian submissions for the Academy Award for Best Foreign Language Film

References

External links
 

2017 films
2017 drama films
2010s Georgian-language films
Drama films from Georgia (country)